In Marxist theory, anarchy of production is a characteristic feature of all commodity production based on private property, which is the primary mode of production in the capitalist market economy. The term is often used as a criticism of market economies, emphasizing their chaotic and volatile nature in contrast to the stable nature of planned economies, as proposed by Marxists.

Examples 
The results of the unplanned "anarchy" of the capitalist market system can be seen in the crisis of overproduction, and underconsumption. One such example, according to the Socialist Party of Great Britain, was the 2008 financial crisis.

See also 

 Anti-capitalism 
 Criticism of capitalism
 Marxism

References

External links 

 https://www.marxists.org/archive/marx/works/1880/soc-utop/ch03.htm

Marxist theory
Marxism